Issue Were Here is the debut live album from stand-up comedian Arj Barker, which is a recording from a live performance at the 1999 Sydney International Comedy Festival in Australia.

Track listing
"Intro" – 1:45
"Aussie Issues" – 3:11
"Flying High Again" – 6:34
"Love Is Weird" – 6:03
"Techno - Bark" – 4:00
"Food Is Weird" – 2:11
"Shmoky Shmoky" – 7:48
"Behold The Riff Master" – 2:45
"Prequel Wars" – 3:45
"The Lesson" – 2:06
"Inappropriate" – 4:28
"Money Matters" – 3:34
"The Solution" – 1:54
"Adults, Kids and Senior Citizens Only" – 0:31
"Thank-you and Goodnight" – 0:33

References 

1999 live albums
Arj Barker albums
1990s comedy albums

Zoltron – package design